Shannon is a census-designated place (CDP) in Robeson County, North Carolina, United States. The population was 197 at the 2000 census.

Geography

Demographics

As of the census of 2000, there were 197 people, 78 households, and 51 families residing in the CDP. The population density was 192.2 people per square mile (74.6/km2). There were 86 housing units at an average density of 83.9/sq mi (32.6/km2). The racial makeup of the CDP was 22.84% White, 30.46% African American, 29.95% Native American, 8.63% from other races, and 8.12% from two or more races. Hispanic or Latino of any race were 19.29% of the population.

There were 78 households, out of which 21.8% had children under the age of 18 living with them, 44.9% were married couples living together, 17.9% had a female householder with no husband present, and 34.6% were non-families. 29.5% of all households were made up of individuals, and 9.0% had someone living alone who was 65 years of age or older. The average household size was 2.53 and the average family size was 3.08.

In the CDP, the population was spread out, with 19.8% under the age of 18, 16.8% from 18 to 24, 25.4% from 25 to 44, 22.8% from 45 to 64, and 15.2% who were 65 years of age or older. The median age was 34 years. For every 100 females, there were 114.1 males. For every 100 females age 18 and over, there were 119.4 males.

The median income for a household in the CDP was $30,156, and the median income for a family was $48,194. Males had a median income of $38,333 versus $27,656 for females. The per capita income for the CDP was $13,321. About 30.9% of families and 44.1% of the population were below the poverty line, including 100.0% of those under the age of eighteen and none of those 65 or over.

References

Census-designated places in Robeson County, North Carolina
Census-designated places in North Carolina